The Taubenkogel is a  high peak in the Dachstein Mountains of Upper Austria, northeast of the  Hallstätter Glacier. It can be reached from the summit station of the Dachstein Cable Car on the Gjaidalm or from the Simony Hut.

In good weather there is a fine view from the summit of the Hoher Dachstein, the Gjaidstein and the Hallstätter Glacier.

Dachstein Mountains
Mountains of the Alps
Mountains of Upper Austria
Two-thousanders of Austria